Robert Keith Reid (born August 30, 1955) is an American former professional basketball player who played thirteen seasons in the National Basketball Association (NBA).

An Atlanta-born 6'8" forward from St. Mary's University, Texas, Robert "Bobby Joe" Reid played thirteen seasons (1977–1982; 1983–1991) in the National Basketball Association as a member of the Houston Rockets, Charlotte Hornets, Portland Trail Blazers, and Philadelphia 76ers.  He had his best overall season in 1980-81, when he was the second leading scorer on the Rockets team that reached the NBA Finals, where he led all scorers in Game 1 with 27 points, before losing to the Boston Celtics. The following year, after the Rockets traded reigning MVP Moses Malone to the Philadelphia 76ers, Reid unexpectedly retired from basketball and moved to Miami, Florida to focus on his Pentecostal faith. After a year away from the NBA, he returned to Houston after they drafted Ralph Sampson with the first overall pick in the 1983 NBA Draft. One of Reid's most notable moments in the NBA was his three-point shot in Game 5 of the 1986 Western Conference Finals against the Los Angeles Lakers that tied the game with just seconds left, helping rally the Rockets into defeating the Lakers and reaching the 1986 NBA Finals. When he concluded his NBA career in 1991, Reid had tallied 10,448 career points, 4,168 career rebounds, and 2,500 career assists.

In recent years, Reid has hosted basketball clinics for young athletes in several countries, such as India.

References

External links
Career statistics at https://www.basketball-reference.com
Where Are They Now: Robert Reid

1955 births
Living people
African-American basketball players
American expatriate basketball people in Hungary
American men's basketball players
American Pentecostals
Basketball coaches from Georgia (U.S. state)
Basketball players from Atlanta
Charlotte Hornets players
Continental Basketball Association coaches
Houston Rockets draft picks
Houston Rockets players
Philadelphia 76ers players
Portland Trail Blazers players
Small forwards
St. Mary's Rattlers men's basketball players
Tri-City Chinook players
Tulsa Fast Breakers players
United States Basketball League coaches
21st-century African-American people
20th-century African-American sportspeople